"Eladio Carrión: Bzrp Music Sessions, Vol. 40" is a song by Argentine record producer Bizarrap and American rapper and singer Eladio Carrión. The song was released on June 9, 2021 through Dale Play Records. This is the first Bzrp Music Sessions in which a Puerto Rican artist has participated, and the second one in which an American artist has participated, after Snow Tha Product's Music Session. The video clip of the song has more than 50 million views on YouTube and also ranked in the top 10 of the Billboard Argentina Hot 100 chart.

Promotion
The session was announced by Bizarrap through a teaser that was published on their social networks, in the video it showed a boy with his Panini album Bizarrap edition.

Personnel
Credits adapted from Genius.

 Eladio Carrión – vocals
 Bizarrap – producer
 Zecca – mixing, drums
 Javier Fracchia – mastering
 Salvador Díaz – videographer
 Agustín Sartori – video vfx

Charts

Certifications

See also
List of Billboard Argentina Hot 100 top-ten singles in 2021

References

2021 songs
2021 singles
Bizarrap songs
Latin trap songs
Song recordings produced by Bizarrap